Yuki Bhambri and Michael Venus were defending champions, but Bhambri decided not to participate.
Venus teamed up with Luke Saville, but they were defeated by Thanasi Kokkinakis and Denis Kudla in the semifinals.
Thanasi Kokkinakis and Denis Kudla won the title, beating Evan King and Raymond Sarmiento 6–2, 7–6(7–4).

Seeds

Draw

Draw

References
 Main Draw

Nielsen Pro Tennis Championship - Doubles
2014 Doubles